TW Horologii is a carbon star and semiregular variable in the southern constellation of Horologium, near the eastern constellation border with Reticulum. It has a ruddy hue and, with an apparent visual magnitude that ranges from 5.52 down to 5.95, is visible to the naked eye and one of the brightest carbon stars. Based on parallax measurements, it is located at a distance of approximately 1,370 light years from the Sun. It is drifting further away with a radial velocity of +14 km/s. In the past this star has been considered a member of the open cluster NGC 1252, but this now seems unlikely.

This is an aging red giant star on the asymptotic giant branch with a stellar classification of C-N4IIIb: and a C2 index of C23.5.  It has been listed as a standard star for that MK spectral class. The star is classified as a semiregular variable of type SRb and has a periodicity of 158 days. It has expanded to 164 times the radius of the Sun and, on average, is radiating 4,390 times the Sun's luminosity from its swollen photosphere at an effective temperature of 3,674 K. The short-lived element technetium has been observed in the spectrum, an indicator of thermal pulses during helium shell burning.

Based on the detection of excess ultraviolet excess, it is most likely a binary star system.  An analysis of the motion of TW Horologii suggests a low-mass companion, although the UV excess suggests it is hot.

In 2013 the luminosity of Mira variables, based on Hipparcos parallaxes, was used to calibrate a Period-luminosity relationship for carbon stars. The absolute magnitude of TW Horologii was calculated to be −1.79.

References

Carbon stars
Asymptotic-giant-branch stars
Semiregular variable stars
Binary stars

Horologium (constellation)
Durchmusterung objects
020234
014930
0977
Horologii, TW